Ajantha  is an Indian film produced and directed by Rajppa Ravishankar. The film was simultaneously shot in Malayalam, Tamil, Telugu and Kannada languages with different starcast.
 
Ilavarasu was the cinematographer for the film and Ilaiyaraaja composed the music. The filming started in 2006 and took three years to complete. The Kannada version was released on 30 October 2009, the Tamil version was released on 9 November 2012 and the Malayalam version on 19 July 2012.

The lead role was played by Vinu Mohan in Malayalam, Ramana in Tamil, Sai Kiran in Telugu and Venkatesh in the Kannada version. Vandana Gupta played the female lead in the Tamil and Telugu version, while Honey Rose was female lead in the Malayalam and Kannada version. The Telugu version never released.

Plot 
In this film, Venkatesh / Vinu Mohan / Ramana plays an upcoming musician. After finishing a recording, he is on his way home when he sees an artist creating art on the street and he is stricken with awe. Onlookers are giving the artist a few rupees each but not as much as the artist expected. At this point, it begins to rain and the drawing begins to dissolve as the onlookers disperse. Venkatesh / Vinu Mohan / Ramana hands over his entire 'bata' for the day to the artist.

Cast 
Malayalam/Kannada

Venkatesh (Kannada)
Vinu Mohan (Malayalam)
Honey Rose 
Anand
Sai Kiran
Harisree Asokan (Malayalam)
Aniyappan
 Kundara Johny
Ponnamma Babu
Salim Kumar (Malayalam)
Mammukoya (Malayalam)
Kalabhavan Santhosh
Usha
Varadha
Swathi
Madhavi
 Lalithasree
Padmini

Tamil

Ramana 
Vandana Gupta 
Su. Senthil Kumaran
Sriman
Pandiarajan
Manobala
Madan Bob
Mahadevan
Balu Anand
Waheeda
Varalakshmi
Mukundan
Parthasarathy
Crane Manohar

Music 
Ilaiyaraaja recorded a record-breaking 36 songs for the film. Mu. Mehta, Pa. Vijay, Snehan, Muthulingam, Thirumavalavan and Su. Senthilkumar wrote the lyrics for the music. The audio was launched in August 2008. Ilaiyaraaja won the Tamil Nadu State Film Award for Best Music Director of 2009 for the film.

Malayalam version 	
"Aarum Thodatha Poovil" - Madhu Balakrishnan, Bhavatharani
"Aayae Aayae" - Madhumitha
"Hradayam Thedum" - Madhu Balakrishnan, K. S. Chitra
"Kaiyil Oru Key Board" - Madhu Balakrishnan
"Oh Oh Madana Madana" - Chitra
"Oruvan Oruval Yen" - Vijay Yesudas
"Thurigai Illa" - Chitra
"Vekkada Onnu" - Naveen, Swetha

Tamil version
"Engae Irundhai" – K. J. Yesudas, Manjari
"Engae Irundhai Isaiyae" – Ilaiyaraaja
"Engae Irundhai" (Repeat) – Yesudas, Manjari
"Oh Oh Ilaignan" – Manjari
"Kaiyil Oru Keyboardum" – Tippu
"Keerthanai" – Madhumitha
"Poduda Sakkapodu" – Shweta Mohan, Tippu
"Thoorigai Indri" – Manjari
"Yaarum Thodatha Ondrai" – Ilaiyaraaja, Shreya Ghoshal
"Yarukku Yarendru" – P. Unnikrishnan

References

External links 
 

2012 films
Indian multilingual films
2010s Malayalam-language films
Films scored by Ilaiyaraaja
2010s Tamil-language films
2012 multilingual films
2010s Kannada-language films